Stichophthalma howqua is a species of butterfly in genus Stichophthalma. It was described by John O. Westwood in 1851, and its subspecies can be found in Southeast Asia and China.

Subspecies
Stichophthalma howqua howqua
Stichophthalma howqua iapetus Brooks, 1949 (southern Vietnam)
Stichophthalma howqua tonkiniana Fruhstorfer, 1901 (northern Vietnam)
Stichophthalma howqua formosana Fruhstorfer, 1908 (Taiwan)
Stichophthalma howqua miyana Fruhstorfer, 1913 (Canton)
Stichophthalma howqua suffusa Leech, 1892 (Sichuan, Fujian)
Stichophthalma howqua bowringi Chun, 1929 (Hainan)

Subspecies gallery

References

Butterflies described in 1851
Amathusiini
Butterflies of Indochina
Taxa named by John O. Westwood